Beyyurdu is a village in the Şemdinli District in Hakkâri Province in Turkey. The village is populated by Kurds of the Herkî tribe and had a population of 346 in 2022.

There was a church of Mar Cyriacus and John the Baptist.

History
Beṯ Daiwe (today called Beyyurdu) was inhabited by 24 Assyrian families in 1877 when visited by Edward Lewes Cutts, all of whom were adherents of the Church of the East and were served by one functioning church as part of the archdiocese of Shemsdin. It was destroyed by the Ottoman Army in 1915 amidst the Sayfo.

The village was evacuated in the 1990s during the Kurdish–Turkish conflict.

Population 
Population history of the village from 2000 to 2022:

References

Bibliography

Villages in Şemdinli District
Kurdish settlements in Hakkâri Province
Historic Assyrian communities in Turkey
Places of the Assyrian genocide